Oakville GO Station is a GO Transit railway station and bus station in Oakville, Ontario, Canada. It is colocated and shares platforms with Via Rail's Oakville railway station.

It is a stop on GO's Lakeshore West line train service and, until October 2007, served as the western terminus for weekend service. On weekdays, one branch of the Highway 407 GO bus service, that connects with Sheridan College, Square One Bus Terminal, Bramalea GO Station, and Highway 407 Bus Terminal terminates at this station. Apart from Union Station, Oakville is the busiest station in GO Transit's network by passenger volume.

It is served by Via Corridor intercity routes between Windsor and Toronto, and the joint Amtrak–Via Maple Leaf service between New York City and Toronto.

History

The Grand Trunk Railway was important to the development of Oakville because it was the
major transportation link for goods and people to Toronto or Hamilton, and beyond. The original Great Western Railway station was built here in 1856, on the same site as the current VIA and GO Stations. The Great Western Railway was purchased in 1882 by the Grand Trunk Railway, which was absorbed into the Canadian National Railway in 1920.

Between 2009 and 2012, improvements on the Lakeshore West line added a third mainline track requiring the demolition of the Via Rail station and the construction a new fully accessible building. Vehicular access was improved and a covered drop off and pick up area was created with more than 1,000 new parking spaces added in a new six-storey parking structure. The bus shelters were replaced with heated shelters in the spring of 2015.

In 2018, Fortinos signed a deal with Metrolinx to have a PC Express kiosk and pick-up van at this station for online orders.

Connecting bus routes
Oakville Transit
 4 Speers-Cornwall
 5/5A Dundas
 10 West Industrial (peak service only)
 11 Linbrook
 13 Westoak Trails
 14/14A Lakeshore West
 15 Bridge
 18 Glen Abbey South
 19 River Oaks
 20 Northridge
 24 South Common
 26 Falgarwood
 28 Glen Abbey North
120 East Industrial (peak service only)
121 Southeast Industrial (peak service only)
 190 River Oaks Express (peak service only)
GO Transit
 18 Lakeshore West
 56 Hwy 407 West

References

External links

Oakville Via Rail & GO Station (Canada RailGuide—TrainWeb)

Buildings and structures in Oakville, Ontario
GO Transit railway stations
Via Rail stations in Ontario
Amtrak stations in Canada
Rail transport in Oakville, Ontario
Railway stations in Canada opened in 1967
1967 establishments in Ontario
Grand Trunk Railway stations in Ontario
Railway stations in the Regional Municipality of Halton